The 1954–55 international cricket season was from September 1954 to April 1955.

Season overview

November

England in Australia

December

Pakistan in India

January

India in Pakistan

March

England in New Zealand

Australia in the West Indies

References

International cricket competitions by season
1954 in cricket
1955 in cricket